Jeetu Nepal also sometimes called Jitu Nepal  is a Nepali Stand-up Comedian, Writer, Actor and Director. He is widely famous and commonly known as Mundre from his hit sitcom Jire Khursani . He started his Television career from TV show name Twakka Tukka. He has acted in more than 3 dozen of Nepali movies including famous movies like Cha Ekan Cha, Chhakka Panja, Chhakka Panja 2, Chhakka Panja 3 and many more. He is very famous for his role as Mundre in Teleserial Jire Khursani.  From 2018 he has started his own Comedy and Chat Show named as Mundre Ko Comedy Club.

Early and personal life
Nepal was born in Jyamire village of Sindhupalchowk district of Nepal. He studied at Jalpa Seconday School, Sindhupalchowk. He passed his School Leaving Certificate examination in year 1992.  He hails as a "middle-class family". He is the seventh child of his parents. He has five elder brother and an elder sister.

Nepal married Muna Nepal on 25 February 2003. They had a daughter and a son.

Filmography

Televisions

First Phrase Films

Second Phrase Films

Awards

References

External links 
 
Jitu Nepal on Facebook

1975 births
Living people
Nepalese male comedians
People from Sindhupalchowk District